Lazycame is the stage name and performing name of Scottish singer-songwriter William Reid. Reid began performing as Lazycame after the breakup of the Jesus and Mary Chain, in which he played guitar and occasionally sang, in 1999.

Critical reaction to Lazycame was mixed, but largely positive, with the NME describing the 1999 debut album as "a sometimes harrowing exercise in catharsis", and the 2000 EP Yawn as "easily the best thing William Reid has touched in years".

Discography

Albums
Finbegin (1999)
 1. God
 2. Complicated
 3. 510 Lovers
 4. Rokit
 5. Gogetfind (Iseeinyoumei)
 6. Fornicate	  
 7. Unfinished Business	
 8. Bluejune	  
 9. Naturallow	  
 10. Mcintoshlost

Saturday the Fourteenth (2000)
 1. Drizzle	  	  
 2. Last Days of Creation	  	  
 3. Lo Fi Li	  	  
 4. Fucko You Genius	  	  
 5. You Don't Belong	  	  
 6. Kill Kool Kid	  	  
 7. Kissround	  	  
 8. Muswil Clouds	  	  
 9. Tired of Fucking	  	  
 10. Mayhem	  	  
 11. Everyone Knows	  	  
 12. Dement	  	  
 13. Unamerican

EPs 
Yawn (2000)
 Drizzle
 K To Be Lost
 Who Killed Manchester?
 Male Wife
 Commercial

References

Year of birth missing (living people)
Living people
Scottish male singer-songwriters